Alex Kruz  (born November 30, 1978) is an American television, theater and film actor. He was born in New Jersey. He is of Ecuadorian descent. He appeared in the films Red Cloud: Deliverance (as Jake Red Cloud) and Tom in America, and has received Best Actor awards from the American Movie Awards, the Canada International Film Festival, the Mexico International Film Festival, the Bare Bones International Film Festival, the DC Independent Film Festival, the Amiens International Film Festival, and nominated for best performance by the Maverick Movie Awards.

References

External links
 

1978 births
American male film actors
American male television actors
American male voice actors
American male stage actors
21st-century American male actors
Male actors from New Jersey
American people of Ecuadorian descent
American people of Quechua descent
Hispanic and Latino American male actors
Living people